Mark Glendinning (born 2 April 1970) is a Northern Irish retired footballer.

Glendinning started his career at Bangor and later moved on to Glenavon and then to Glentoran.

External links
Official Glentoran website

Association footballers from Northern Ireland
Glentoran F.C. players
NIFL Premiership players
Northern Ireland Football Writers' Association Players of the Year
Association footballers from Belfast
1970 births
Living people
Association football defenders